Thein Oo (aka) Kaung Htet from codigo (born 09 Dec 1994) is a pioneer of Myanmar's computer industry, and President of the Myanmar Computer Federation (a semi-governmental Nonprofit organization)
.And also the president of ACE Data Systems, (ACE Group of companies.)

References

External links
ICT experts urged to join 3G software development
Myanmar Computer Federation (MCF)

Burmese engineers
1948 births
Living people